True Believer is an album by guitarist Phil Keaggy, released in 1995.

Track listing
 "The True Believers" (Alan Shacklock) - 4:36
 "Wild Heart" (Randy Holland/Gordon Kennedy) - 5:00
 "Only You (Can Wash My Sins Away)" (Alan Shacklock) - 4:31
 "Salvation Army Band" (Phil Keaggy/Alan Shacklock) - 4:08
 "Don't Let Go of My Heart" (Phil Keaggy/Kip Raines/Jimmie Lee Sloas) - 4:10
 "Son of Man" (Phil Keaggy) - 4:37
 "And on That Day" (Phil Keaggy/John Sferra) - 5:05
 "Be Thou My Vision" (traditional) - 4:50
 "Have Mercy Lord" (Alan Shacklock) - 4:01
 "The Survivor" (Phil Keaggy) - 7:30

Personnel
Phil Keaggy: guitar, acoustic guitar, 12 string guitar, EBow, bass, keyboards, vocals, background vocals
Phil Madeira: Hammond organ
Alan Shacklock: guitar, piano, keyboards (organ, strings, bells, brass, flute), drum programming, background vocals
Gordon Kennedy: guitar, background vocals
Jimmie Lee Sloas: bass, background vocals
Wade Jaynes: bass
Eric Darken: percussion, saxophone
Steve Brewster: drums
Randy Holland: background vocals
Susan Ashton: vocals

Production notes
Pete York: executive producer
Alan Shacklock: producer, mixing
Todd Robbins: engineer
Aaron Swihart: assistant engineer
Kevin B. Hipp: assistant engineer
Mike Griffith: assistant engineer
Norman Miller: ambience
Tom Laune: mixing
Greg Parker: mixing, mixing assistant
Ken Love: mastering
Karen Philpott: creative director
Ron Keith: photography
Lori Turk: make-up
Jamie Kearney: stylist

References

1995 albums
Phil Keaggy albums
Albums produced by Alan Shacklock